Rundvik is a locality situated in Nordmaling Municipality, Västerbotten County, Sweden with 817 inhabitants in 2010.

References 

Populated places in Västerbotten County
Populated places in Nordmaling Municipality